Sander Puri (born 7 May 1988) is an Estonian professional footballer who plays as a midfielder for Meistriliiga club Tartu Tammeka and the Estonia national team.

Club career

Levadia
Puri was born in Tartu, Tartu County. In 2005, at the age of 16, Puri started his professional career with FCI Levadia Tallinn. He scored his first Meistriliiga goal on 1 June 2005, in a 2–0 victory over Kuressaare. On 30 July 2007, Sander and his twin brother Eino Puri joined Tulevik a half-year loan. He played 14 league matches, scoring four goals. In 2008, Puri had two trials with Bundesliga club Borussia Dortmund and in late 2009 with Scottish Premier League club Celtic.

Larissa
On 14 December 2009, Puri signed a five-year contract with Super League Greece club Larissa. On 18 March 2010, Puri scored the winning goal against PAOK, in the final moment of the match with a tap in from close range. However, in his second season, Puri's place in the team became increasingly limited which resulted him being loaned out twice. His contract was mutually terminated on 31 January 2012.

Loan spells with Korona Kielce and Pápa
In January 2011, Puri went on loan to Ekstraklasa club Korona Kielce, on a contract until the end of the season. He made his debut in a 1–1 draw against Zagłębie Lubin on 26 February 2011. Puri scored his first goal for the club in a 3–3 home draw against Polonia Bytom on 12 March 2011. However, due to injuries he only made eight appearances for the club.

In July 2011, Puri was loaned to Nemzeti Bajnokság I club Pápa. On 23 July 2011, Puri made his debut in a 2–0 home win over Siófok. On 21 September 2011, Puri scored his first goal in a 10–0 win against Győrszemere in the third round of the 2011–12 Magyar Kupa. The loan contract was mutually terminated on 19 January 2012 after spending six months at the club. At Pápa, Puri made 14 appearances, scoring one goal.

KuPS
Puri joined Veikkausliiga club KuPS on 27 March 2012 on a contract until the end of the season, after a successful trial. He made his debut after starting in a 1–0 away win over VPS in the 2012 Finnish League Cup group stage on 25 February. His first goal came in a 5–1 away win over JJK on 11 June 2012. Puri scored for KuPS in the UEFA Europa League qualifying 1–0 home win against Bursaspor. He scored the winning goal against MYPA in the semi-final of the 2012 Finnish Cup on 30 August, but received a straight red card in the final, which the team lost to Honka.

On 12 December 2012, Puri was released by the club after one season. After his release, Puri was offered a contract with A Group club Beroe Stara Zagora, but he rejected the move.

St Mirren
On 15 March 2013, Puri signed a contract until the end of 2012–13 with Scottish Premier League club St Mirren, despite the interest of divisional rivals Kilmarnock, but was not offered a contract following a trial. He made his debut on 31 March 2013 as an 88th-minute substitute in a league match against Celtic. Having made three appearances for the club, Puri was released on 15 May 2013.

York City

Puri signed for League Two club York City on 13 June 2013 on a one-year contract with the option of a one-year extension. He made his debut in a 1–0 home win over Northampton Town on 3 August 2013, in the first match of 2013–14. He was released by York in May 2014.

Sligo Rovers
Puri signed for League of Ireland Premier Division club Sligo Rovers after a successful trial on 1 February 2015. On 22 May 2015, he scored his first goal in a 1–1 away draw with Derry City, after rounding the ball past goalkeeper Shaun Patton.

Karviná
Puri signed for Czech National Football League club Karviná on 18 February 2016.

Nõmme Kalju
In August 2016, Puri returned to Estonia and signed a contract with Nõmme Kalju.

Waterford
In January 2017, Puri signed for League of Ireland First Division club Waterford. He made his debut in a 1–0 defeat to Athlone Town on 24 February 2017. A lengthy injury absence prevented Puri being involved with Waterford from March to July 2017. Despite returning to training in July it was only on 18 August Puri made a return for Waterford as he appeared as an unused substitute in the teams crucial 1–0 win over UCD. The Estonian international finally made his long-awaited return for Waterford in the 1–1 draw against Shelbourne on 1 September and he nearly scored a late winner on two occasions, his first effort struck the post and then he was only inches away from tapping home from close range but his outstretched leg couldn't convert. His impressive cameo earned him a start for the game against Wexford on 15 September, he assisted Mark O'Sullivan for his second goal in that game, Waterford beat Wexford 3–0. That win coupled with Cobh Ramblers 3–0 defeat to Cabinteely crowned Waterford as league champions with two games to spare.

Puri signed a new one-year contract with Waterford for the 2018 season as the club entered the League of Ireland Premier Division. Puri scored his first goal for Waterford in their 1–0 win over Bohemians.

Nõmme Kalju
In February 2019 Puri returned to Nõmme Kalju, signing a two-year contract.

TJK Legion
On 7 February 2021, Puri signed a contract with TJK Legion. Puri made his debut for the new club in a 3–4 Loss against FCI Levadia Tallinn.

International career
Puri was capped by Estonia at under-17, under-19 and under-21 level. He made his debut for the senior national team on 30 May 2008 against Latvia in the 2008 Baltic Cup. He scored his first national team goal on 22 November 2008, in a 1–1 draw against Lithuania in a Mayors Cup match. A goal against Saint Kitts and Nevis saw him awarded the Estonian Silverball, for the best goal scored for Estonia in 2015.

Personal life
Puri is one of three triplets: his brother, Eino Puri, is also a footballer and his sister, Kadri Puri, is a volleyball player.

Career statistics

Club

International

International goals

Scores and results list Estonia's goal tally first, score column indicates score after each Puri goal.

Honours
FCI Levadia Tallinn
Meistriliiga: 2006, 2008 2009

Waterford
League of Ireland First Division: 2017

Individual
Estonian Silverball: 2015

References

External links

1988 births
Living people
Sportspeople from Tartu
Estonian footballers
Estonian expatriate footballers
Estonia youth international footballers
Estonia under-21 international footballers
Estonia international footballers
Association football wingers
FCI Levadia Tallinn players
Viljandi JK Tulevik players
Athlitiki Enosi Larissa F.C. players
Korona Kielce players
Lombard-Pápa TFC footballers
Kuopion Palloseura players
St Mirren F.C. players
York City F.C. players
Sligo Rovers F.C. players
MFK Karviná players
Nõmme Kalju FC players
Waterford F.C. players
Esiliiga players
Meistriliiga players
Super League Greece players
Ekstraklasa players
Nemzeti Bajnokság I players
Veikkausliiga players
Scottish Premier League players
English Football League players
League of Ireland players
Czech National Football League players
Expatriate footballers in the Czech Republic
Expatriate footballers in England
Expatriate footballers in Finland
Expatriate footballers in Greece
Expatriate footballers in Hungary
Expatriate association footballers in the Republic of Ireland
Expatriate footballers in Poland
Expatriate footballers in Scotland
Estonian expatriate sportspeople in the Czech Republic
Estonian expatriate sportspeople in England
Estonian expatriate sportspeople in Finland
Estonian expatriate sportspeople in Greece
Estonian expatriate sportspeople in Hungary
Estonian expatriate sportspeople in Ireland
Estonian expatriate sportspeople in Poland
Estonian expatriate sportspeople in Scotland
Triplets
FCI Levadia U21 players